The Sulphur Mountain Formation is a geologic formation of Early to Middle Triassic age. It is present on the western edge of the Western Canada Sedimentary Basin in the foothills and Rocky Mountains of western Alberta and northeastern British Columbia. It includes marine fossils from the time shortly after the Permian-Triassic extinction event.

The Sulphur Mountain Formation was first described as a member of the Spray River Formation by P.S. Warren in 1945, who named it for Sulphur Mountain in Banff National Park. It was later raised to formation status. Its type section is located in the Spray River gorge at the southern end of Sulphur Mountain.

Lithology and stratigraphy 
The Sulphur Mountain Formation was deposited on the continental shelf along the western margin of the North American craton, which at that time was part of the supercontinent of Pangaea. It consists primarily of grey to rusty brown dolomitic and calcareous quartz siltstone, with interbeds of silty sandstone, silty dolomite, mudstone, shale, carbonaceous shale, and minor fine-grained quartz sandstone. Cross-bedding and ripple marks are common in its strata.

The Sulphur Mountain Formation is subdivided into the following members:

Paleontology 
The Sulphur Mountain Formation has yielded fossils that provide a record of Triassic life shortly after the Permian-Triassic extinction event. Remains of extinct marine reptiles and fish have been found in its strata, as  well as conodonts; shells of brachiopods and bivalves; teeth of Hybodus; shells of ammonoids; the ichnofossils Thalassinoides, Planolites, and Zoophycos; and traces of microbial mats.

Fish found at the formation include:

Remains of the following marine reptiles have been found in the Sulphur Mountain Formation:

Distribution and thickness 
The Sulphur Mountain Formation is present in the foothills and eastern front ranges of the Canadian Rockies from the Canada–United States border in southwestern Alberta to the Pine River area of northeastern British Columbia.

Relationship to other units 
The Sulphur Mountain Formation is laterally equivalent to Montney, Doig, and Halfway Formations in the subsurface beneath the plains of Alberta and northeastern British Columbia, and to the Toad, Grayling, and Liard Formations in the foothills of northeastern British Columbia. It unconformably overlies the Permian Ishbel Group or, in some areas, the Mississippian Rundle Group.  It is conformably overlain by the Whitehorse Formation in the southern part of its extent and by the laterally equivalent Charlie Lake Formation in the north.  In areas where those formations were removed by erosion it is unconformably overlain by the Jurassic Fernie Formation.

Economic resources

Petroleum and natural gas 

Outcrops of the Sulphur Mountain Formation provide an analog for studying the Montney Formation, a laterally equivalent formation that is a major producer of shale oil and shale gas in the subsurface to the east.

Building stone 
The flaggy siltstones of the Vega Member have been quarried as building stone in the Canmore area. This rock, which is commonly called "Rundle Rock" or "Rundle Stone", has been used extensively to face buildings and construct floors, patios, and fireplaces in the Jasper, Banff, and Calgary areas.

Phosphate 
Although localized deposits of granular phosphate are present at the base of the Whistler Member, they lie within Jasper National Park and are protected from development.

See also 
 List of fossiliferous stratigraphic units in Alberta

References 

Geologic formations of Canada
Western Canadian Sedimentary Basin
Stratigraphy of Alberta
Stratigraphy of British Columbia
Triassic Alberta
Triassic British Columbia
Triassic System of North America
Lower Triassic Series
Middle Triassic Series
Building stone